Bullerby Syndrome is a term referring to an idealization of Sweden, which may occur in German-speaking Europe. It consists of a stereotypical image of Sweden usually with positive associations, including wooden houses, clear lakes, green forests, elk, people with blond hair, happy people and midsummer sunshine. The term comes from Astrid Lindgren's The Six Bullerby Children books, set in rural Sweden.

Berthold Franke at the Goethe-Institut in Stockholm, Sweden, wrote articles about the phenomenon, published in Svenska Dagbladet. He stated that it was originally a view of Sweden, but now also the wish for a better Germany. According to him, Sweden symbolizes a healthy society and nature untouched by mankind.

In February 2008, the term was named "word of the month" by the Swedish Language Council.

See also
 Sweden Hills
 Suecophile
 Stockholm syndrome

References

External links

German culture
Germany–Sweden relations
Swedish culture
Culture-bound syndromes
Admiration of foreign cultures